Method of Breathing is Chicosci's second album, released in 2002 under EMI Philippines.

Track listing

Credits
Executive producer: JV Colayco
Supervising producers: Willie A. Monzon & Francis Guevarra
Line producers: April Rama And Jade Ybanez
Recording engineer: Angee Rozul
Recorded, mixed and mastered at Tracks Studios
Album cover art direction: Willie A. Monzon
Cover design and digital imaging: Joseph R. Conde
Album photography: Carlo Gueerrero
Interactive CD design: Jomuel Mananquil

Music videos 
 Paris

References 

Chicosci albums
2002 albums